Harries Ground, Rodbourne is a 6.87 hectare biological Site of Special Scientific Interest in Wiltshire, England, notified in 2003.

This site exists due to the passion of Sir John Michael Hungerford Pollen, 7th Baronet of Redenham.

Sources

 Natural England citation sheet for the site (accessed 1 April 2022)

External links
 Natural England website (SSSI information)

Sites of Special Scientific Interest in Wiltshire
Sites of Special Scientific Interest notified in 2003